Nanohyla marmorata is a species of frog in the family Microhylidae. It is found in Laos and Vietnam. It is not considered threatened by the IUCN.

Taxonomy 
N. marmorata was formerly placed in the genus Microhyla, but a 2021 study using morphological and phylogenetic evidence moved nine species (including N. marmorata) to a new genus, Nanohyla.

N. marmorata was described in 2004 alongside another species, Microhyla pulverata; however, M. pulverata is now believed to be a junior synonym of N. marmorata based on phylogenetic evidence.

References 

marmorata
Amphibians of Laos
Amphibians of Vietnam
Amphibians described in 2004
Taxonomy articles created by Polbot